Coleophora schauffeleella is a moth of the family Coleophoridae. It is found in Iran.

References

schauffeleella
Moths of the Middle East
Moths described in 1959